Vulcaniella vartianae is a moth in the family Cosmopterigidae. It was described by Hans Georg Amsel in 1968 and is found in Pakistan.

References

Vulcaniella
Moths described in 1968